Kinidinnin Stéphane Konaté Sornan (born 23 August 1980) is an Ivorian basketball player for the ABC Fighters and . He is nicknamed "El Jefe".

Professional career
Konaté started his career with Africa Sports in 2002, where he played three seasons. In 2005, he signed with Abidjan Basket Club, abbreviated as ABC.

Konaté won the 2015 FIBA Africa Clubs Champions Cup with ABC. He was also named the Most Valuable Player of the tournament.

In 2008, Konaté signed in Morocco with ASE Essaouira of the Division Excellence.

In the 2011–12 season, Konaté signed with Spanish side Palencia in the LEB Gold. He averaged 2.6 points in five games, playing 10.4 minutes per game.

In the 2013–14 season, Konaté played with Egyptian side Gezira of the Egyptian Basketball Super League.

In 2014, he returned to ABC, later re-named ABC Fighters.

In October 2021, Konaté was on the roster of Malian club AS Police. He had previously received offers from AS Police, but administrative issues prevented making the move.

National team career
Konaté competed as a member of the Côte d'Ivoire national basketball team for the first time at the FIBA Africa Championship 2003.  He has since gone on to compete for the team at the FIBA Africa Championship 2005, FIBA Africa Championship 2007, and FIBA Africa Championship 2009. In his most recent tournament, he averaged 8.7 points per game for the Côte d'Ivoire team that won the silver medal at the 2009 African Championship to qualify for the 2010 FIBA World Championship.

Honours
ABC Fighters

 16× Ivorian National Championship: (2006, 2007, 2008,  2010, 2011, 2012, 2013, 2014, 2015, 2016, 2017, 2019, 2020, 2022)

FIBA Africa Club Champions Cup: (2015)
Gezira
Egyptian Basketball Super League: (2014)
Ivory Coast
 Runners-up AfroBasket 2009
 Runners-up AfroBasket 2021

Individual awards 

 FIBA Africa Club Champions Cup MVP: (2015)
 All-FIBA Africa Club Champions Cup Team: (2005)

 Ivorian National Championship Regular Season MVP: (2021)

References

1980 births
Living people
Ivorian men's basketball players
People from Bouaké
Gezira basketball players
Point guards
2010 FIBA World Championship players
Abidjan Basket Club players
Palencia Baloncesto players
AS Police basketball players
ABC Fighters players